MasterChef Australia All-Stars is an Australian cooking reality show which screened on Network Ten from 26 July 2012. It featured a number of returning contestants from the first three seasons of MasterChef Australia (including season 1 and season 3 winners Julie Goodwin and Kate Bracks), revisiting past challenges in order to raise money for charity.

The series aired for three weeks, mostly during the 2012 Summer Olympics. It was also the last iteration of the show to be shot in the MasterChef kitchen in Alexandria, Sydney, home of the series for all past seasons.

Contestants
The following contestants returned from Season's 2009 (Blue Team), 2010 (Red Team) and 2011 (Yellow Team). Notable absentees were Season 2010 winner Adam Liaw (due to shooting his new TV series) and Season 2011 runner-up Michael Weldon. The initial stages of the competition focused on the Teams raising money, but from episode 7, contestants competed separately and were eliminated in order to crown the 'best of the best' All-Star.

Guest chefs
 Adriano Zumbo – Series Premiere
 Adrian Richardson – Immunity Challenge
 Dan Hong – Immunity Challenge
 Jeremy Strode – Immunity Challenge
 Martin Boetz – Immunity Challenge
 Darren Purchese – Immunity Challenge
 Alessandro Pavoni – Immunity Challenge
 Shaun Presland – Immunity Challenge
 Vincent Gadan – Immunity Challenge
 Curtis Stone – Elimination Challenge 2
 Neil Perry – MasterClass
 Maggie Beer – Grand Finale
 Peter Gilmore – Grand Finale

Episodes

Elimination chart

 
  In Episode 8, Justine, Kate and Dani received immunity from the elimination challenge for winning the previous challenge.
  In Episode 10, Kate had immunity from the elimination challenge for winning the previous challenge.
  In Episode 15, Kate earned a pass straight into the finale for winning the challenge.
  In the Finale, the first round was an elimination round. Kate scored the fewest points and became the 3rd Place finisher.

International syndications

See also
List of Australian television series
MasterChef Australia

References

External links
MasterChef Australia – Official MasterChef Australia Website
BoysTown
Oxfam Australia
Cambodian Children's Fund
The Salvation Army
Youth Off The Streets
Cancer Council Australia
Save The Children Australia
Starlight Children's Foundation
Médecins Sans Frontières (Doctors Without Borders)
TEAR Australia
OzHarvest
Lort Smith Animal Hospital

MasterChef Australia
Australian cooking television series
2012 Australian television series debuts
2012 Australian television series endings
English-language television shows
Television shows set in Sydney